Jurgen Van den Broeck (born 1 February 1983) is a Belgian former road bicycle racer, who competed professionally between 2004 and 2017 for the , ,  and  squads. Van den Broeck specialised in the time trial discipline, having been Junior World Champion against the clock in 2001. The promise he first displayed in minor stage races like the Tour de Romandie and Eneco Tour was later validated and confirmed by top-10 finishes in all three Grand Tours: the Giro d'Italia, the Tour de France and the Vuelta a España.

Cycling career

Early career
Born in Herentals, Van den Broeck won the Junior World Time Trial Championship in 2001 and made his professional debut in 2003 as a stagiaire for the Quick-Step–Davitamon–Latexco team.

U.S. Postal Service/Discovery Channel (2004–2006)
Rather than remaining in Belgium, however, Van den Broeck signed with the American  team of Lance Armstrong for his first full season as a professional in 2004. His only result of note that year was 6th-place overall in the Tour of Belgium.

Van den Broeck remained with Johan Bruyneel's team in 2005 when Discovery Channel took over the title sponsorship, and he continued with the Americans in 2006 after Armstrong retired. During that period he finished on the podium in stages of the Deutschland Tour and the Tour of Belgium (where he also won the mountains classification), and he rode to a top-20 finish overall in the Tour de Romandie. The following month Van den Broeck scored his first win as a professional, taking the Schriek, Derny in Belgium ahead of Erwin Vervecken and future cyclo-cross world champion Niels Albert.

Predictor–Lotto (2007–2015)

2007–2008
At the age of 24, Van den Broeck managed to finish in the top-10 on the general classification at the 2007 Eneco Tour with his new team, though he also won the bronze medal in the Belgian National Time Trial Championships. After completing his first Grand Tour in an anonymous 74th place at the 2007 Giro d'Italia, Van den Broeck finally showed that he had talent as a stage racer when he returned to Italy the following year and came seventh overall in the 2008 Giro d'Italia. Merely months later, both Riccardo Riccò and Emanuele Sella – respectively finishing 2nd and 6th in the 2008 Giro d'Italia – were sanctioned for doping.

2009

Showing excellent form in the 2009 Tour de France, Van den Broeck climbed with the leaders through the Alps, although he had crashed heavily on the fourth stage team time trial, and lost more than seven minutes. His consistency resulted in 15th place in the final general classification ranking, which was later improved to 14th after the disqualification of 11th placed Mikel Astarloza for testing positive for EPO; he also placed 9th place in the competition for the polka dot jersey.

2010–2011
The following season he rode to an important and somewhat surprising 3rd place (5th place prior to Alberto Contador and Denis Menchov being disqualified and removed from the results) in the 2010 Tour de France, becoming the first Belgian to finish in the top 5 since Claude Criquielion in 1986. After the Tour Van den Broeck won two criteriums: one in Peer and the other in his hometown of Herentals.

In the 2011 Tour de France, after an encouraging first week and while aiming for a general classification podium spot, Van den Broeck had to abandon the race along with another overall contender, Alexander Vinokourov, after a massive and spectacularly grim downhill crash which left him with a pneumothorax, broken ribs and a fractured shoulder. Not to be deterred, however, Van den Broeck recovered from his injuries in time to compete in the 2011 Vuelta a España, where he finished 8th overall.

2012–2015
In 2012, Van den Broeck finished 3rd in the Volta a Catalunya and then finished 5th in the Criterium du Dauphiné, showing good form for the forthcoming Tour de France. On Stage 7 of the Tour de France, a mountain top finish at La Planche des Belles Filles, Van den Broeck lost 1 minute 54 seconds to stage winner Chris Froome after getting a flat tyre just before the final climb. However Van den Broeck then showed his good form in the mountains to move him up to finishing 4th overall.

In 2013, Van den Broeck abandoned in the Tour de France after he crashed in stage 5.

In 2015, he finished twelfth at the Giro d'Italia. In June, he won the National Time Trial Championships for the first time in his career.

Team Katusha (2016)
In September 2015,  announced that Van Den Broeck would join them for 2016, after nine seasons with Lotto.

LottoNL–Jumbo (2017)
In May, it was announced that Van den Broeck would retire at the end of the 2017 season.

Major results

2000
 3rd Time trial, National Junior Road Championships
2001
 1st  Time trial, UCI Junior Road World Championships
2002
 1st  Overall Tour of Limburg
 8th Overall Le Triptyque des Monts et Châteaux
2003
 1st Zellik–Galmaarden
 1st Clásica Memorial Txuma
 2nd Time trial, National Under-23 Road Championships
 2nd Overall Le Triptyque des Monts et Châteaux
1st Stage 2b
 2nd GP Istria 1
 2nd Liège–Bastogne–Liège U23
 2nd GP Krka
 3rd Kattekoers
 4th Road race, UEC European Under-23 Road Championships
2004
 5th Overall Redlands Bicycle Classic
 6th Overall Tour of Belgium
2005
 8th Overall Eneco Tour
2006
 1st Mountains classification, Tour of Belgium
 8th Kuurne–Brussels–Kuurne
2007
 3rd Time trial, National Road Championships
 6th Overall Danmark Rundt
 10th Overall Eneco Tour
2008
 7th Overall Giro d'Italia
2009
 1st Natourcriterium Herentals
 4th Overall Eneco Tour
2010
 2nd Overall Vuelta a Andalucía
 3rd Overall Tour de France
 4th Overall Critérium du Dauphiné
 10th Overall Tour of the Basque Country
2011
 2nd Overall Vuelta a Andalucía
 4th Overall Critérium du Dauphiné
1st Stage 1
 7th Overall Vuelta a España
2012
 3rd Overall Volta a Catalunya
 4th Overall Volta ao Algarve
 4th Overall Tour de France
 5th Overall Critérium du Dauphiné
 10th La Flèche Wallonne
2013
 2nd Overall Vuelta a Andalucía
 5th Overall Tour de San Luis
 7th Overall Tour de Romandie
 9th Overall Volta a Catalunya
2014
 3rd Overall Critérium du Dauphiné
2015
 1st  Time trial, National Road Championships
2016
 8th Overall Tour of California

Grand Tour general classification results timeline

References

External links

Profile at Lotto-Belisol official website

1983 births
Living people
Belgian male cyclists
Cyclists at the 2008 Summer Olympics
Olympic cyclists of Belgium
People from Herentals
Cyclists from Antwerp Province